Demetrios I, also Dimitrios I or Demetrius I, born Demetrios Papadopoulos (September 8, 1914 – October 2, 1991) was, as a successor to St. Andrew (the apostle to whom the See of Constantinople traces its roots), the 269th Ecumenical Patriarch of Constantinople from July 16, 1972, to October 2, 1991, serving as the spiritual leader of 300 million Eastern Orthodox Christians. Before his election as patriarch, he served as the metropolitan bishop of Imvros. He was born and died in Constantinopole, in modern-day Turkey.

Role in ecumenism
On November 30, 1979, Demetrios proclaimed the establishment of the official theological dialogue between the Eastern Orthodox and the Catholic Church, at that time led by Pope John Paul II. He also met with two archbishops of Canterbury representing the Anglican Communion.

In 1987, Demetrios travelled to the Vatican where he was received by John Paul II. At a solemn ceremony in St. Peter's Basilica, the patriarchs of East and West together recited the Nicene-Constantinopolitan Creed of the Church in Greek as originally defined in AD 381, without the controversial Filioque clause. The Pope later recalled the event in his ecumenical encyclical letter Ut Unum Sint.

In an 8-city tour of the United States in 1990, Patriarch Demetrios met with President George H. W. Bush, with Christian and Jewish leaders, and with public officials, and spread the message that: "Today, Orthodoxy is not a strange or alien factor in America. It is flesh of its flesh and bone of its bone".

References

1914 births
1991 deaths
20th-century Ecumenical Patriarchs of Constantinople
Theological School of Halki alumni
Constantinopolitan Greeks
Clergy from Istanbul
People from Sarıyer